Lisa Anne Sari (born October 18, 1984) is an American soccer midfielder who last played for Los Angeles Sol of Women's Professional Soccer. She also coaches FC Portland.

References

External links
 Los Angeles Sol player profile
 Portland player profile
 Portland coaching profile

Los Angeles Sol players
Portland Pilots women's soccer players
Seattle Sounders Women players
1984 births
Living people
USL W-League (1995–2015) players
Soccer players from Washington (state)
People from Longview, Washington
American women's soccer players
Women's association football midfielders
Women's Professional Soccer players